Mulberry is a census-designated place (CDP) in Adair County, Oklahoma, United States. The population was 138 at the 2010 census.

Geography

Demographics

References

Census-designated places in Adair County, Oklahoma
Census-designated places in Oklahoma